The Great Seal of Missouri is used to authenticate certain documents issued by the Government of Missouri. The phrase is used both for the physical seal itself, which is kept by the secretary of state, and more generally for the design impressed upon it. The Great Seal was designed by Robert Wells of Jefferson City.

Design  

The center of the seal contains the Great Seal of the United States on the right side, and, on the left, symbols representing the state. On both sides of the center circle, a bear, represents strength and bravery; a crescent moon, a symbol of the Virgin Mary and a nod to the French who first settled Missouri, represents the newness of statehood and the potential for growth. Surrounding these symbols is the motto "United we stand, divided we fall".  The belt buckle signifies the State's ability to secede from the Union if deemed necessary, i.e., the belt can be unbuckled. Two mighty bears, representing Missouri's native bears, support this center shield. A scroll carries the state motto, Salus populi suprema lex esto, a Latin phrase meaning "Let the welfare of the people be the supreme law." The year 1820 is inscribed in Roman numerals below the scroll, although Missouri was not officially granted statehood until 1821. A star representing each of the other states of the Union (Missouri became the 24th) graces the top portion of the seal. The outer circle of the seal bears the words "The Great Seal of the State of Missouri". Above the shield is a helmet representing Missouri's state sovereignty. The large star above the helmet surrounded by 23 smaller stars represents Missouri's status as the 24th state. The cloud around the stars indicates the problems Missouri had in becoming a state.

Salus populi suprema lex esto (Latin "Let the good of the people be the supreme law" or "The welfare of the people shall be the supreme law") is found in Cicero's De Legibus (book III, part III, sub. VIII), as Ollis salus populi suprema lex esto.

The phrase is the state motto of Missouri,  accepted in its state seal. It is also the motto, and appears on the coat of arms, of the City of Salford, the London Borough of Lewisham, the Duquesne University School of Law, and is used as the motto of the Vlaams Belang political group in the Belgian Chamber of Representatives. John Locke uses it as the epigraph in his Second Treatise on Government and refers to it as a fundamental rule for government.

History  
Robert Wells, of Jefferson City, designed the seal. The seal was adopted on January 11, 1822.  The state's Department of Conservation admits that “The bears on the Great Seal of the State of Missouri are grizzly bears, which never resided in the state.”

Government Seals of Missouri

See also  

 Flag of Missouri
 Symbols of the State of Missouri

References

External links 
 Office of the Secretary of State of Missouri

Symbols of Missouri
Missouri
Missouri
Missouri
Missouri
Missouri
Missouri
Missouri

it:Salus populi suprema lex esto